Michael Wolfgang Laurence Morris, Baron Naseby,  (born 25 November 1936) is a British Conservative Party politician.

Early life
Born in London and educated at Bedford School and St Catharine's College, Cambridge, Morris was taught to fly in Pakistan and Canada and served in the Royal Air Force.

Parliamentary career

Morris contested Islington North at the 1966 general election, being beaten by Labour's Gerry Reynolds.

He was first elected to the House of Commons at the February 1974 general election for the then-marginal seat of Northampton South. His majority was just 179 in February 1974, and 141 in October 1974. In 1983 boundary changes turned it into a safe Conservative seat. 

Morris oversaw the passing of the Maastricht Treaty in the Commons in his role as Deputy Speaker. He was defeated by 744 votes at the 1997 general election, when the Labour Party under Tony Blair won a landslide victory.

From 1992, Morris held the non-voting position of Chairman of Ways and Means and Deputy Speaker, and after the election he accepted a life peerage as Baron Naseby, of Sandy in the County of Bedfordshire on 28 October 1997.

Controversies

In 2014, the Daily Telegraph's chief political commentator Peter Oborne described Lord Naseby as an apologist for the Sri Lankan government, who had given misleading and inaccurate statements about war crimes in Sri Lanka. He was described as giving "comfort to the perpetrators of state sponsored terror" and receiving hospitality from the Sri Lankan government.
Human rights groups accuse Lord Naseby of purposely downplaying the death toll figures gathered by the United Nations panel in 2011 which found that as many as 40,000 Tamil civilians may have been killed in the final months of the civil war in 2009.

References 

1936 births
Living people
Alumni of St Catharine's College, Cambridge
Conservative Party (UK) MPs for English constituencies
Naseby
Life peers created by Elizabeth II
Deputy Speakers of the British House of Commons
UK MPs 1974
UK MPs 1974–1979
UK MPs 1979–1983
UK MPs 1983–1987
UK MPs 1987–1992
UK MPs 1992–1997
Naseby, Michael Morris, Baron
People educated at Bedford School
Sri Lanka Rathna